Madisonville is an unincorporated community in Ralls County, in the U.S. state of Missouri. The community lies approximately four miles southeast of Center and on the banks of Spencer Creek.

History
Madisonville was platted in 1836, and named after James Madison Croswaite, the sibling of a first settler. A post office called Madisonville was established in 1838, and remained in operation until 1906.

References

Unincorporated communities in Ralls County, Missouri
Unincorporated communities in Missouri